Ken Butler III (born May 2, 1982) is an American professional stock car racing driver. He is the older brother of Brett Butler and the son of Aaron's president Ken Butler. Butler III has driven in the NASCAR Nationwide Series, Camping World Truck Series, ARCA Racing Series, and the Pro Cup Series.

Racing career

Pro Cup Series 
Butler's interest in racing started when his father took younger brother Brett and Ken to a go-kart race when Ken was eighteen. He took classes at the Richard Petty Driving Experience and Buddy Baker's Speed Tech. Five years later, Butler ran his first season in the Pro Cup Series, recording a best finish of twelfth at Bristol Motor Speedway and finishing seventeenth in points. He ran the following season, 2006, and recorded his first top ten and top five. He also failed to qualify for two races that season. He ran a race at South Boston Speedway in 2007 while focusing on the ARCA Racing Series and NASCAR Camping World Truck Series.

ARCA Racing Series 
Butler ran a limited schedule in the 2007 ARCA Re/Max Series with Eddie Sharp Racing as part of its driver development program. He scored his first career victory in only his fourth start, holding off Ken Schrader at Toledo Speedway. However, a damper was put on Bulter's win as he bumped Michael McDowell out of the way in what some, including Schrader, called an unfair move. Continuing to run as part of ESR and Michael Waltrip Racing's development program, he ran along teammates Justin Lofton and Scott Speed. Butler was not victorious at all that year, the only one of three cars on the team to do so. Despite that, he moved up to the NASCAR Nationwide Series for 2009. That year, Butler ran a limited schedule for Andy Belmont but struggled.

NASCAR 
Balancing a part-time ARCA Racing Series schedule in 2007, Butler made two starts for Darrell Waltrip Motorsports in the Camping World Truck Series, but failed to finish either of them. Two years later, Butler signed with R3 Motorsports to run just about half the schedule in the Nationwide Series and named Aaron's as sponsor. He ran well at intermediate tracks such as Las Vegas Motor Speedway and Kentucky Speedway, recording top twenty results on those tracks, but struggled at short tracks like Richmond International Raceway, Dover International Speedway, Indianapolis Raceway Park and Iowa Speedway. Out of a full-time ride in 2010, Butler ran one race for Rick Ware Racing in the Truck Series. He did not return to NASCAR until 2013, when SR² Motorsports brought Butler back for an eight-race schedule, along with his brother Brett Butler for a few races. Out of the eight races, Butler III failed to finish five but posted top-thirty finishes in all the races he finished.

Personal life 
Butler had his first child, Piper Shay, in 2009 with his wife Jamie.

Motorsports career results

NASCAR
(key) (Bold – Pole position awarded by qualifying time. Italics – Pole position earned by points standings or practice time. * – Most laps led.)

Nationwide Series

Camping World Truck Series

ARCA Re/Max Series
(key) (Bold – Pole position awarded by qualifying time. Italics – Pole position earned by points standings or practice time. * – Most laps led.)

References 

NASCAR drivers
ARCA Menards Series drivers
Racing drivers from Atlanta
Racing drivers from Georgia (U.S. state)
Living people
1982 births